Needhiyin Nizhal is a 1985 Indian Tamil-language film, directed by Bharathi-Vasu and produced by Santhi Narayanasamy. The film stars Sivaji Ganesan, Radha, Prabhu and M. N. Nambiar. It was released on 13 April 1985.

Plot 
To the general public, Krishna Prasad (M. N. Nambiar) is known as a rich do-gooder that conducts weddings for the poor and gets the couples jobs in foreign countries. In reality, it is a ploy to traffic the brides into sex work. Along with his associates Ethiraj (Vinu Chakravarthy), Nagaraj (Sathyaraj) and Sukumar (Sivachandran), he manages to evade the law and avoid any consequences for his actions. D.I.G Nithyanandam attempts to catch Krishna Prasad but is shot multiple times and lands in a wheel chair. Nithyanandam's oldest son is Vijay (Prabhu), a recent college grad that is nursing a broken heart after his girlfriend Swapna (Radha) suddenly dumps him. Vijay always gets into fights as he insists on standing up for what's right. He is inspired to join the police after his father is hurt. Vijay sets out to catch Krishna Prasad's group but for every step closer he gets toward his goal, he suffers. He loses his friend Mohan (Chandrasekhar), his parents and younger brother Dileep. He is also beaten badly and presumed dead. Vijay uses this as an opportunity to go  undercover and catch his enemies. In the process, he also learns some shocking truths about his past and his family.

Cast 
Sivaji Ganesan as D.I.G Nithyanandam
Radha as Swapna
Prabhu as Vijay
M. N. Nambiar as Krishna Prasad
Major Sundarrajan as Police Officer
Chandrasekhar as Mohan
Sathyaraj as Nagaraj
Loose Mohan as Bhai
Vinu Chakravarthy as Ethiraj
Srividya as Vijay's Mother
Nizhalgal Ravi as James
Sivachandran as Sukumar
Y. G. Mahendran as Unni

Soundtrack 
The soundtrack was composed by Shankar–Ganesh and the lyrics were by Vaali.

References

External links 
 

1980s Tamil-language films
1985 films
Films directed by P. Vasu
Films directed by Santhana Bharathi
Films scored by Shankar–Ganesh